Gonchigjalzangiin Badamdorj (Padma Dorje; 1850-1921)  was an early 20th-century Mongolian religious figure and prime minister under the Bogd Khaanate from late 1919 to January 1920. He is most remembered in Mongolia for caving to Qing threats and agreeing to Mongolia's "voluntary" relinquishment of independence from Chinese rule in 1919.

Early career

Little is known about Badamdorj's early life, however, from 1900 to 1911 served as an administrator, or Erdene Shanzav of the Bogd Gegeen's estates. He was a close confidant, advisor, and tutor to the Khalkha spiritual leader, the Jebtsundamba Khutuktu, (later to become the Bogd Khan) who, in 1895 dispatched him to St. Petersburg as the first Mongolian envoy to meet with the newly enthroned Czar Nicholas II and probe Russian willingness to support Mongolian aspirations for independence from Manchu rule.  The Russians responded positively and suggested the Mongolians work secretly with Russia's envoy in Niislel Hüree.

In April 1910, Badamdorj moved to protect Mongolian lamas after a riot erupted near Gandan Monastery between lamas and Chinese merchants. As part of Qing efforts to increase Han control over Mongol territory and reign in the Buddhist hierarchy, the Qing emperor Puyi issued a decree removing Badamdorj as Shanzav and transferring his authority to the Qing Amban (viceroy) Sando. Despite this, Badamdorj was not a supporter of Mongolian independence and when the Jebtsundamba Khutuktu sent secret delegation of Khalkha nobles to St. Petersburg in 1911 to seek Russian backing for independence, Badamdorj revealed the mission to Sando.

Following Mongolia's declaration of independence from Chinese rule in November 1911, the Bogd Khan appointed Badamdorj the first Minister of Religion and State.  In 1915 he was appointed Minister of Internal Affairs (and thus de facto prime minister) after his previous office, along that of prime minister, was abolished. Although he headed the Bogd Khan's government, Badamdorj was adamant that the Jebtsundamba Khutuktu and his retinue should concern themselves only with religious rather than temporal matters, and so corruption flourished unchecked in Outer Mongolia, led by Badamdorj himself who accepted bribes in exchange for the granting of royal titles and falsification of census figures.

Abolition of Mongolian autonomy 

Between 1915 and 1919, as Russian influence in the Far East waned following the outbreak of World War I, Badamdorj, along with other conservative elements of the Bogd Khan's government supported moves by Yuan Shikai and the Republic of China to bring an autonomous Outer Mongolia back under Chinese rule.  When Chinese troops were sent to Urga in August 1919 to protect against a threatened Buriat and Inner Mongolian Pan-Mongolist invasion led by Grigory Semyonov, Khalkha nobles agreed to sign a declaration of "Sixty-Four Articles" "On respecting of Outer Mongolia by the government of China and improvement of her position in future after self-abolishing of autonomy".
In October 1919, China's new Northwest Frontier Commissioner Xu Shuzheng arrived in Urga with a military escort and demanded that the "Sixty-Four Articles" be renegotiated.  He submitted a much tougher set of conditions, the "Eight Articles," calling for the express declaration of Chinese sovereignty over Mongolia, an increase in Mongolia's population (presumably through Chinese colonization), and the promotion of commerce, industry, and agriculture. Xu installed Badamdorj, who represented reactionary lamas and was considered to be more pliable to Chinese demands, as prime minister. Xu threatened to exile the Bodg Khan if Badamdorj and others did not sign the "Eight Articles" wherein the Mongolian government "voluntarily" relinquished the country's autonomy to Chinese administration. Other national leaders including Foreign Minister Balingiin Tserendorj and the Bogd Khan himself soon followed suit. Badamdorj remained prime minister for only a short period thereafter, until January 1920.

Badamdorj was branded a coward for not standing up to foreign threats and he soon became the victim of a rumor campaign designed to taint his reputation. Ordinary people and even children would regularly insult him. Disgraced, Badamdorj fled to the countryside and died a short while later.

References

Sources
 Sanders, Alan J. K. (1996). Historical dictionary of Mongolia. Asian historical dictionaries, No. 19. Lanham, MD: Scarecrow. 
 Baabar, B. (1999). From world power to Soviet satellite: History of Mongolia. Cambridge: University of Cambridge. 

Prime Ministers of Mongolia
Mongolian anti-communists
1920 deaths
Foreign ministers of Mongolia
1850 births